Clyde Hamilton Coombs (July 22, 1912 – February 4, 1988) was an American psychologist specializing in the field of mathematical psychology. He devised a voting system, that was hence named Coombs' method.

Coombs founded the Mathematical Psychology program at the University of Michigan.  His students included Amos Tversky, Robyn Dawes, and Baruch Fischhoff, all important researchers in Decision Sciences. The classic text "An Introduction to Mathematical Psychology," by Coombs, Dawes, and Tversky was a must for Michigan graduate students in Mathematical and Experimental Psychology.

In 1959 he was elected as a Fellow of the American Statistical Association.

The development of scaling theory by Louis Guttman and Clyde Coombs has been recognized by Science as one of 62 major advances in the social sciences in the period 1900-1965

Selected bibliography
 
 Coombs, Clyde H. (1964). Theory of data. New York, Wiley. (OCoLC)565269224.
 Coombs, Clyde H. (1983). Psychology and Mathematics: An Essay on Theory. Ann Arbor: University of Michigan Press.
 Coombs, Clyde H., Coombs, Lolagene C. & Lingoes, James C. (1978). Stochastic cumulative scales. In S. Shye (Ed.) Theory construction and data analysis in the behavioral sciences. San Francisco: Jossey-Bass.

References

1912 births
1988 deaths
20th-century American psychologists
University of Michigan faculty
Fellows of the American Statistical Association
American psychologists